Arthur James Hook (12 February 1877 – 12 February 1957) played first-class cricket for Somerset in two matches, one in 1897 and one in 1906. He was born at Porlock, Somerset, and died on his 80th birthday at Over Stowey, also in Somerset.

Hook played as a left-handed batsman in the lower middle order. His first game was against Oxford University in 1897, when he scored 7 and 15. His only other match came nine years later against Hampshire and he scored 6 and 15, with the second innings being not out.

References

1877 births
1957 deaths
English cricketers
Somerset cricketers